Tabernaemontana siphilitica is a species of plant in the family Apocynaceae. It is found in northern South America.

References

siphilitica
Flora of northern South America
Flora of Brazil